"Hold Her Tight" is a song written by Alan Osmond, Wayne Osmond, and Merrill Osmond and released by The Osmonds on June 24, 1972.  It was featured on their 1972 album, Crazy Horses.  The song reached No. 14 on the Billboard Hot 100 on August 5, 1972.  The verses of the song are sung by Alan, Wayne and Merrill and the chorus is sung by the whole group.

References

1972 songs
1972 singles
The Osmonds songs
Songs written by Alan Osmond
Songs written by Merrill Osmond
Songs written by Wayne Osmond
MGM Records singles
Song recordings produced by Michael Lloyd